The Democratic Party is a liberal party in Curaçao founded in 1944. The party has participated in elections for the Estates of the Netherlands Antilles (Curaçao constituency) and the Island Council of Curaçao until the dissolution of the Netherlands Antilles in 2010, obtaining a single seat in the island council in 2007.

By obtaining 1019 registrations of support, the party qualified (a minimum of 743 was required) for participation in the Curaçao General Election of 2012 on 19 October in a combined list with Laboral named Partido Democrat Laboral, where it obtained 1.2% of the votes but failed to obtain any seats. In the primary elections of 2016, the party received 1094 votes, again sufficient for participation, but did not end up winning any seats.

Election results
From 1954 until 1978, the party was part of  the government of the Netherlands Antilles led by prime-minister Efrain Jonckheer, but it did not have any seats in the Estates of the Netherlands Antilles from 1995. At the legislative elections in the Netherlands Antilles, 18 January 2002, the party won 2.4% of the popular vote and none of the 14 Curaçao-seats in the Estates of the Netherlands Antilles. It took part in the elections of 27 2006 and 2010 where it obtained 3.7% and 2.5% of the vote of Curaçao respectively, but failed to win a seat.

In 2007, the party obtained a single seat in the island council (with 5% of the vote). At the Island Council elections of 2010, DP obtained 4% of the vote (3048 votes), about 500 votes shy of a seat in the Island Council (and its successor: the Estates of Curaçao).

References

See also
Democratic Party Sint Maarten
Democratic Party (Sint Eustatius)
Liberalism worldwide

Liberal parties in Curaçao
Political parties in Curaçao
1944 establishments in Curaçao and Dependencies
Political parties established in 1944